Ma Zhanshan (November 30, 1885 – November 29, 1950) was a Chinese general famous for resisting the Japanese invasion of Manchuria. Ma was placed in charge of the Northeastern Army in Heilongjiang Province during the invasion and ignored orders from the central government not to resist the Japanese. He became a national hero in China by fighting the unsuccessful but highly symbolic Jiangqiao campaign against the Kwantung Army's advance into Heilongjiang. After his defeat, he feigned defection to the Japanese and was appointed Minister of War in the new Japanese puppet state of Manchukuo. He then joined and took command of the guerrilla campaign against Japanese occupation, taking with him large amounts of supplies, funds, and military intelligence. Ma Zhanshan rejoined the Northeastern Army after the guerilla movement was largely defeated. He continued to oppose Chiang Kai-shek's policy of non-resistance and supported the Xi'an Incident that forced Chiang to form the Second United Front with the Chinese Communist Party (CCP). He commanded several units in the National Revolutionary Army during the Second Sino-Japanese War while covertly cooperating with the CCP. Ma avoided direct participation in the postwar Chinese Civil War and eventually defected the Communists, dying a year later in 1950.

Biography

Early life
Ma was born in Gongzhuling, in Jilin province, to a poor shepherding family. At the age of 20, he became a security guard of Huaide County. For his exceptional marksmanship and equestrianism, he was promoted to Guard Monitor of the 4th Security Guard Battalion by Wu Junsheng, Commander of Tianhou Road Patrol and Defense Battalion of Mukden, in 1908.

According to some western sources, Ma Zhanshan was born in Liaoning in 1887. However, most claim 1885 as his birth year.

He was of Manchu heritage and his grandson Ma Zhiwei, a member of Chinese People's Political Consultative Conference, mentioned the Manchu ethnicity of the family in his official biography and news report as well. There are also resources which said Ma Zhanshan was a Chinese Muslim and his Muslim name was Muazzam Husain.

In 1913, Ma was appointed as Major and Company Commander of 3rd Company, 3rd Regiment, 2nd Brigade of the Central Cavalry Army in the Army of the Republic of China.  In 1920, he was promoted to colonel and followed his patron, warlord Wu Junsheng.

He started his military career in Zhang Zuolin's Northeastern Army, serving as a brigade commander of 5th Cavalry Brigade, 17th Cavalry Division, then as brigadier of 3rd Infantry Brigade of the Heilongjiang Army.  After Zhang's death in 1928, Ma was nominated as Heilongjiang Provincial Bandit Suppression Commander, and Heilongjiang Provincial Cavalry Commander-in-chief in 1928.

While British diplomatic documents described him as one of the "bandit" military men who received no training and did not receive instruction, he was a master sharpshooter and equestrian.

Japanese Invasion of Manchuria
After the Mukden Incident, when the Japanese Kwantung Army invaded the provinces of Liaoning and Jilin, Governor Wan Fulin of Heilongjiang Province was in Beijing, leaving no one in authority in the province to take charge of defenses against the Japanese. Zhang Xueliang telegraphed the Nanjing Government to ask for instructions, and then appointed Ma Zhanshan to act as Governor and Military Commander-in-chief of Heilongjiang Province on October 10, 1931. Ma arrived in the capital Qiqihar on October 19 and took office the next day. He held military meetings and personally inspected the defense positions while facing down parties advocating surrender, saying “I am appointed as Chairman of the province, and I have the responsibility to defend the province and I will never be a surrendering general”.

Ma became famous around the world after the incident.

The Japanese invaders repeatedly demanded to repair the Nen River Bridge, which had been dynamited in earlier civil strife to prevent an advance by a rival Chinese warlord. These demands were refused by Ma Zhanshan.  The Japanese, determined to repair the bridge, sent a repair crew, guarded by 800 Japanese soldiers. Nearby were 2,500 Chinese troops, and the Battle of Nenjiang Bridge ensued.  Each side charged the other with opening fire without provocation, and thus began the Jiangqiao Campaign. Although eventually forced to withdraw his troops in the face of Japanese tanks and artillery, Ma became a national hero for his resistance to the Japanese, which was reported in the Chinese and international press. Ting Chao and other senior commanders followed Ma's example at the industrial city of Harbin in Jilin province and elsewhere, and his successes inspired the local Chinese to aid or enlist in his forces. On November 18, Ma evacuated Qiqihar.  However, after the General Ting Chao was driven from Harbin, Ma's forces suffered serious casualties and were soon driven over the Soviet border.

Ma appealed in a telegram to the League of Nations asking for help against the Japanese.

$2,000 were cabled by Chinese in America to Ma to help him fight.

Manchukuo
Because of his fame and heroics efforts in resisting the Japanese invasion of Manchuria, Colonel Kenji Doihara offered Ma Zhanshan a huge sum of $3,000,000 in gold to defect to the new Manchukuo Imperial Army. Ma agreed, and offered to tour the country to reconcile the local inhabitants to the new government. He flew to Shenyang in January 1932, where he attended the meeting that founded the puppet state of Manchukuo. Ma was ill at the time, and avoided the signing of the Independence Declaration of Manchukuo. He attended the inaugural ceremony of Pu Yi as Regent of Manchukuo in March the same year, and was appointed as War Minister of Manchukuo and Governor of Heilongjiang Province under the new government. However, the Japanese did not fully trust Ma (as with other Manchukuo officials), and he had to ask approval from his Japanese advisor about all matters of the province before taking any actions.

General Ma had secretly decided to rebel against the Japanese after his "defection", using large amounts of Japanese money to raise and re-equip his new volunteer force with munitions. He secretly transported weapons and ammunition out of the arsenals, and evacuated the wives and families of his troops to safety. On April 1, 1932, he led his troops from Qiqihar, supposedly on a tour of inspection. However, at Heihe on April 7, he announced the reestablishment of the Heilongjiang Provincial Government, and his independence from Manchukuo.  Ma reorganized his troops into 9 brigades at the beginning of May, and then he established another 11 troops of volunteers at Buxi, Gannan, Keshan, Kedong, and other places. This force was styled the “Northeast Anti-Japanese National Salvation Army”. Ma appointed himself as nominal Commander-in-chief and absorbed the other volunteer armies in the region, commanding a total fighting force of about 300,000 men at its peak strength.

The units under Ma undertook ambushes along the major roads and badly weakened Manchukuo and Japanese troops in several engagements. In the “Ma Chan-shan Subjugation Operation”, the Kwantung Army transferred a large mixed force of Japanese and Manchukuo troops to encircle and destroy Ma's Army. Ma Zhanshan's troops, though seriously depleted from previous battles, escaped due to the laxity of the Manchukuo troops. In September, Ma Zhanshan arrived in Longmen County and established a relationship with the Heilungkiang National Salvation Army of Su Bingwen. In the “Su Ping-wei Subjugation Operation”, 30,000 Japanese and Manchukuo troops forced Ma Zhanshan and Su Bingwen to retreat across the border into the Soviet Union in December. Most of these troops were then transferred to Rehe.

General Ma Zhanshan commanded 3,500 guerilla fighters against the Japanese, conducting attacks such as a raid on the Manchukuo treasury, attacking Changchun, the capital, and hijacking six Japanese planes from an airfield.

General Ma caused so much trouble to the Japanese that when his equipment and horse were captured, the Japanese presented them to the Emperor in Tokyo, assuming that he was dead. They were enraged to discover that he had survived and escaped. The China monthly review reported that "the persistence with which the Japanese telegrams reiterate and insist that General Ma Chan-san is dead is little short of comical". The Japanese, over the course of several months, continuously invented different versions of how Ma Zhanshan allegedly "died".

After General Ma escaped, his men kept up the fight against the Japanese occupying forces. They seized 350 Japanese and Korean hostages and held them for weeks and kidnapped foreigners such as the son of a British general and an American executive's wife.

Second Sino-Japanese War
Ma himself stayed abroad in the Soviet Union, Germany, and Italy, only returning in June 1933.

Ma Zhanshan was allegedly one of the commanders of the Soviet army during the Xinjiang War (1937), during which he fought against the fellow Muslim General Ma Hushan. It was reported that he led Russian troops disguised in Chinese uniforms along with bombers during the attack, which was requested by Sheng Shicai. Other sources do not mention this doubtful participation of Ma Zhanshan in this war, since he was a Commander in Chief of Cavalry in the National Revolutionary Army in China in 1937.

He went to Chiang Kai-shek ask for armies to fight against the Japanese but was refused assistance. Ma then settled in Tianjin until October 1936 when Chiang Kai-shek suddenly sent him to the front of the Chinese Civil War. At Xi'an at the time of Xian Incident, he suggested to Zhang Xueliang not to kill Chiang Kai-shek while the country was in trouble and signed on the “Current Political Situation Declaration” issued by Zhang Xueliang and Yang Hucheng. Zhang Xueliang appointed Ma Zhanshan as the Commander-in-chief of the “Anti-Japanese Aid Suiyuan Cavalry Group Army”, which was suspended afterwards when Zhang Xueliang was detained by Chiang Kai-shek.

After the Marco Polo Bridge Incident, Ma Zhanshan was appointed as Commander of the Northeastern Advance Force, in charge of the four northeastern provinces Liaoning, Jilin, Heilongjiang and Rehe. Ma Zhanshan established a headquarters in Datong in August 1937, led his troops to fight the Japanese in Chahar, Suiyuan Datong and Shanxi, and cooperated with Fu Zuoyi's troops in the defense of Suiyuan and in the Yinshan War.

Ma Zhanshan abhorred the nonresistance policy of the Kuomintang government and he sided with the Chinese Communist Party in its anti-Japanese policy. He visited Yan'an in 1939 in order reach an accommodation with the Eighth Route Army.  Ma Zhanshan was appointed as Chairman of the Provisional Government of Heilongjiang in August 1940 by the Chinese Communist Party, and held that title in secret to the end of the war.

Post-War
After the defeat of Japan, the Kuomintang government appointed Ma Zhanshan as Northeast Deputy Security Commander. He took office in Shenyang, but a half year later he retired to his home in Beijing saying he was ill. He crossed over to the Communist Party in January 1949 after persuading General Fu Zuoyi to allow the city to be peacefully transferred to the Communists. After the founding of the People's Republic of China, Chairman Mao Zedong invited him to attend the Chinese People's Political Consultative Conference in June 1950, but he failed to attend because of illness and he died the same year on November 29 in Beijing.

See also
 Defense of Harbin
 Pacification of Manchukuo
 Manchukuoan Anti Bandit Operations
 Statue of Ma Zhanshan, Shanghai

Notes

References

Books

External links

Ma Zhanshan  with photo
The volunteer armies of northeast China

1885 births
1950 deaths
Republic of China warlords from Jilin
Hui people
National Revolutionary Army generals from Jilin
People's Republic of China politicians from Jilin
Chinese people of World War II
Government ministers of Manchukuo
Chinese Nationalist military figures
Members of the Kuomintang
People from Siping
Generals of Manchukuo
Chinese collaborators with Imperial Japan
Kuomintang collaborators with Imperial Japan